Kingston High School is a comprehensive four-year school with an enrollment of approximately 2,500 students and staff located off of Broadway, Andrew Street, and West O’Riley Street in Kingston, New York, United States.

Campus
The school comprises several buildings, connected on all levels or by pedestrian bridges. The Main building, which was the original high school building was built in the neoclassical style, and still features its original terrazzo marble flooring. The auditorium and theatrical stage are located there, along with various classrooms, and former administration offices. A music wing housing the band and choir rooms was built onto the back of the Main building. On one side of the Main building is the Kate Walton Field House, which contains the  gym and pool. The Salzmann building is located behind the Main building, and now holds the school’s primary entrance. It contains many of the faculty and administration offices, as well as the cafeteria, library, and numerous classrooms. The newest buildings, the East and West, are located on opposite sides of the Salzmann building. The Whiston building is on the other side of the Main building and is adjacent to the West building. It contains the art department. The Carnegie building contains the KHS TV studio and the former library. The Myron J. Michael, or MJM building held ninth grade students until it was torn down during 2017-18, when construction of the East and West building began, as well as the improvements of the Field House and Salzmann building. The school was founded in 1915, at its current location.

Several precautions were taken during the COVID-19 pandemic for student safety. Desks in classrooms were socially-distanced with protective shields, hallways became one-way passages (with arrows indicating walking direction) to limit student contact, and bathrooms in the 200s level of each building were closed.

Kingston High School Television

KHS-TV is a student-run television studio within the school. Founded during the 1991–1992 school year as a partial replacement to loudspeaker announcements on the high school complex, the studio began producing KHS Morning Edition on November 23, 1992 to bring students in select rooms a daily ten-minute show packed with announcements, video coverage of happenings in the school, lunch and weather forecasts, sports, and more. With the start of season two on September 14, 1993, the morning show was retitled Wake Up, KHS! In 1999, the station spread throughout the campus via closed-circuit television, completing its replacement of loudspeaker announcements.

In October 2000, several KHS-TV students covered President Bill Clinton's trip to Kingston. Clinton said, "Wake Up, KHS!" as he toured Washington Avenue, behind George Washington School, and later did an impromptu interview with several students at the Kingston Airport. He also signed a poster with KHS-TV's original logo.

Programming
KHS-TV's Wake Up, KHS! is a ten-minute broadcast produced live at the start of second period for ten minutes. Primarily intended to inform the student body, the show highlights school events, sports, weather, and happenings from throughout the city while also occasionally including student-produced original comedy shorts in an effort to entertain viewers. With the creation of KHS-TV Channel 20, the show was first publicly viewable on January 6, 2009. It previously aired from 7:50 AM - 8 AM, then from 7:45 AM – 7:55 AM (2017–18).

The studio, which was originally housed in the Salzmann building and is now housed in the Carnegie Library Building, also periodically produced Kingston City Schools Chronicles, a show hosted by the current Kingston City Schools superintendent, discussing the internal workings of the school district and the latest news from various schools. Shows were approximately thirty minutes in length and were pre-recorded for airing at later times. Originally debuting on public-access television public access channel 23 in February 2005, the show moved to KHS-TV Channel 20 upon the creation of the new outlet.

When pre-packaged shows were not airing, various independently produced video clips and announcement slides were aired to fill the rest of the broadcast day. Typical broadcast blocks were noon, 4PM, 7PM, 9PM, and midnight, with the "Wake Up, KHS" broadcast live at 8:36 am on school days.

The show now airs on the Kingston City School District website.

Distribution
KHS-TV debuted on channel 17 via closed-circuit television within campus, later moving internally to channel 5. During its first sixteen years, the station could be viewed only within the school. As part of a deal with Time Warner Cable and the City of Kingston, KHS-TV began broadcasting programming throughout the district via Kingston Time Warner Cable channel 20 towards the end of December 2008. The station remains on channel 5 within the campus, showing slides during the day after Wake Up, KHS! instead of video.

KHS-TV has slowly branched out to have a limited presence on the Internet, beginning with K.B. Alantine Productions, a production group formed in January 2007, and comprising past members Kevin Brice, Alan Fortine, and Richard Valentine. The group originally formed in an effort to bring fresh new comedy to Wake Up, KHS! The three quickly started an ongoing series featuring characters Mr. Bananaman and Agent V in comedic situations, eventually dubbing the segment "WUKI4" (for "Wake Up, KHS in 4", after a countdown found at the end of some early videos). Since the 2006–2007 school year, the segment has expanded to include otherfeatures such as coverage of local events, with the segment's name changing by 0.1 each year. Though all members have since graduated, production has continued on a limited basis.

The organization has also expanded with its production of KHS-TV Summer, a summer program allowing for broadcast beyond the September–June school year. Created in the summer of 2009, the show combines comedic shorts with in-depth coverage of local events during the summer months.

Music
Kingston High School maintains a music program involving approximately ten percent of the student body. The department features a string orchestra, chamber orchestra, chorus, choir, symphonic band, concert band, wind ensemble, and nationally recognized jazz program, which, in 2009, was selected as a finalist at the Essentially Ellington Competition at Lincoln Center in New York City. 
 
In the fall of 2012, the Kingston High School Tiger Marching Band came in first place in the New York State Field Band Conference Championships, held on October 28 at the Carrier Dome in Syracuse, New York. The band scored an 85.60, its highest ranking at the time. The band came in second place in the two years prior with scores of 82.85 and 84.40. Their current highest score is 89.00, which was achieved at their own Fall Fanfair. The marching band program is the largest in New York State.

The KHS Choir was founded by Leonard Stine in the 1930s and has performed at such venues as Carnegie Hall and the Fisher Center at Bard College.

Sports
Kingston High School's Tiger sports program has many different school-funded activities. The school sponsors football, swimming and diving, tennis, indoor and outdoor track and field, cross-country, Nordic skiing, golf, lacrosse, field hockey, soccer, basketball, baseball, softball, volleyball, wrestling and crew. Other sports, including rugby and cheerleading, operate semi-independently as clubs within the school, without varsity program funding.

Notable alumni 
 Billy Costello, world boxing champion
 Justin Robinson, Monmouth University basketball player

References

External links
 Kingston City School District website

Public high schools in New York (state)
Schools in Ulster County, New York
Kingston, New York